Chances is the debut album by Belgian vocal trance group Sylver. Their debut single, "Turn the Tide" climbed to the top of the official local club/dance chart soon after its release. Second single "Skin" followed in January 2001.
The album spawned three more singles: the dance track "Forever in Love", the ballad "In Your Eyes" and "Forgiven". In Germany, the album and the track "Turn the Tide" were certified gold for selling over 500,000 units together.

Track listing
"Turn the Tide" (4:31)
"Skin" (4:30)
"Forgiven" (3:30)
"Forever in Love" (4:30)
"In Your Eyes" (4:00)
"Mystery of Tomorrow" (5:00)
"The Smile Has Left Your Eyes" (4:30)
"The Edge of Life" (3:30)
"Angel on My Shoulder" (4:30)
"Secrets" (4:30)
"Turn the Tide" (CJ Stone Remix) - hidden track
"Skin" (Velvet Girl Remix) - hidden track

Charts

Weekly charts

Year-end charts

References 

2001 debut albums
Sylver albums
Universal Music Group albums